Black House Comics was an Australian independent comic book and graphic novel publisher. Publisher Baden Kirgan started the company in 2008  when he decided to create an "Australia Vertigo" comics arm  within his commercially successful printing company—Jeffries Printing Services. The original idea was to publish dark stories within multiple genres in a quality print product. Black House Comics' signature title was The Dark Detective: Sherlock Holmes.

The books were distributed in Australia to newsagents through Gordon and Gotch, and internationally via the Black House Comics online distribution arm blackboox.net.

Black House Comics ceased trading in 2014, although many of its titles continue to be published either independently or by other companies.

Comics Books

The Dark Detective: Sherlock Holmes 
This ongoing original series is set in Victorian England and features the world's most famous detective. The stories redefine gothic Victoriana with their fusion of the traditional Sherlock Holmes character and world with 1960’s British Hammer House of Horror supernatural style stories, The creators are lifelong Sherlock Holmes aficionados. There are currently seven comic books on offer, and many more scheduled to be published. 
Writer: Christopher Sequeira.
Artist: Phil Cornell.
Cover Artist: Dave Elsey.
Published: 2008 - 2012.

Eeek! 
Eeek! is an ongoing all Australian retro-horror anthology series in the spirit of the black and white comics magazines published in the USA during the 1950s, 60s and 70s. There are currently five comic books in print with additional ones scheduled for publication in 2012 and beyond. The first five books are also published in graphic novel format.
Writer / Artist: Jason Paulos.
Cover Artist: Jason Paulos.
Published: 2010 - 2012.

Pay Through the Soul 
This anthology collection of satirical web cartoon strips about Cloud Bitch and several other unique characters from a parallel universe comment on the state of our world and our social relationships. 
Writer / Artist: M Emery.
Published: 2011.

The Soldier Legacy 
This ongoing series follows a Digger (i.e. Australian soldier) serving in the New Guinea jungle during World War II who dons a mask and takes on "The Soldier" superhero persona to honour a fallen friend who died saving his life. It also follows the Digger's grandson in modern times who has donned his grandfather's mask to fight a different war against the rising gang activity and street violence in the suburbs. There are currently three issues available, and others scheduled for publication.
Writer / Artist: Paul Mason.
Published: 2011 - 2012.

The Twilight Age 
This five-part miniseries is about an FBI agent, Justin Barnett, on the trail of the vicious blood-drinking serial killer dubbed "Dracula" by the press and the public. The story takes place during a plague that spreads around the world destroying humanity. 
Writer / Artist: Jan Scherpenhuizen.
Published: 2008 - 2009.

Graphic Novels

Criminal Element 
This anthology features ten stories about crimes and the criminals who commit them, and includes stories of gangsters, demons, burglars, nurses, hitmen, saboteurs, slavers, and bounty hunters.
Editor: Jason Franks.
Writers: Various.
Artists: Various.
Cover Artist: Jason Paulos.
Published: 2012.

The Dark Detective: Sherlock Holmes 
The first book in this upcoming graphic novel collection collects the first four issues of the comic book series.
Writer: Christopher Sequeira.
Artist: Phil Cornell.
Cover Artist: Dave Elsey.
Published: 2011.

Eeek! Volume 2 
This graphic novel collects the first five comic books in the series. Volume 1 is published by Asylum Press in the USA.
Writer: Jason Paulos. Artist: Jason Paulos and other contributors. Cover Artist: Jason Paulos. Published: 2012.

The Guzumo Show 
This satirical comic strip collection examines how racism, sexism, homophobia, religion, politics, misogyny and misanthropy perpetuate the modern social landscape, and how ridiculous human beings can be. 
Writer / Artist: M Emery
Published: 2010

McBlack 
Set in a dystopian sci-fi world, this is the story of Whiteface McBlack, a former private dick – as well as a ghost, part demon and complete psychopath – who gave up his old life to pursue his true calling—murder, sabotage, theft and arson. 
Writer / Artist: Jason Franks.
Published: 2011.

A Mind of Love 
This graphic novel centres on an adult book store clerk's obsession with a waitress, and is an exploration of how modern men have harnessed technology and porn to gratify their lust at the expense of their humanity. 
Writer / Artist: Bruce Mutard.
Published: 2010.

Magazines

Terra 
This is a triannual newsstand magazine featuring serialised stories by many of Australia's most talented comics creators, which brings together a diverse range of science fiction, fantasy, horror and crime stories.
Editor: Jason Franks. Contributors: Various. Published: 2012.

Pulp Fiction Novellas

After the World 
This series of novellas is set in a post zombie-apocalypse universe. Each novella is self-contained but part of the same universe. Titles include: Killable Hours, Gravesend, Corpus Christi, Army Corpse, and the anthology Pack Rules. Writers: Jason Fischer, Clay Blakehills, Jason Franks and others. Cover Artist: Jason Paulos. Published: 2010 - 2012.

Media  
The Soldier Legacy appeared in a Youi Insurance commercial, which screened on Australian television from October 2011 to early 2012.

Black House Comics publisher, Baden Kirgan, appeared as a judge on Beauty and the Geek (Australia) in a superhero costuming challenge. The segment aired on Australian television on Channel 7 on Thursday 27 October 2011 at 7.30pm.

Other 
The Dark Detective: Sherlock Holmes cover artist Dave Elsey won an Academy Award in 2011 for Best Special Effects Makeup for The Wolfman.

Jason Paulos was nominated for an Aurealis Award for Best Illustrated Book or Graphic Novel in 2010 for Eeek! Weird Tales of Suspense.

Black House Comics was one of the sponsors of the inaugural Australian Society of Authors (ASA) Comics Masterclass, featuring Colleen Doran, which was held in Sydney in November 2011.

References

External links

2008 establishments in Australia
Publishing companies established in 2008
Book publishing companies of Australia
Comic book publishing companies of Australia